Costantino Balbi (Genoa, 12 September 1676 - Genoa, 1741) was the 154th Doge of the Republic of Genoa and king of Corsica.

Biography 
On February 7, 1738, he was elected by the Grand Council as the new doge of the Republic: the one hundred and eighth in biennial succession and the one hundred and fifty-fourth in republican history. As doge he was also invested with the related biennial office of king of Corsica. Ceased the dogal office on February 7, 1740 and retired to private life, he died in Genoa in 1741.

See also 

 Republic of Genoa
 Doge of Genoa

References

18th-century Doges of Genoa
1676 births
1741 deaths